Taloja Central Jail is a prison in Taloja near Taloja Panchnand railway station on the outskirts of Kharghar, a suburb of the city of Mumbai in the state of Maharashtra in India. It was opened in 2008 and has capacity for 3000 inmates.

The Indian Jesuit Roman Catholic priest and tribal rights activist Stan Swamy was held there preceding his death in 2021.

References 

Prisons in Maharashtra
2008 establishments in Maharashtra